Road Rash 3D is a racing video game developed and published by Electronic Arts exclusively for the PlayStation.

Gameplay
The game plays similarly to previous games developed in the Road Rash series, which involves the player racing their motorcycle against other motorcyclists. Gameplay favors an arcade-like style, with little emphasis on realism. While racing, the player has the option of punching, or using weapons to attack other opponents, to slow down their progress. The ultimate goal is to place first in the race in order to earn money to upgrade the player's motorcycle. Conversely, the worst scenarios are to finish last, which does not earn money, or be stopped by police officers, which actually loses money. Despite sharing many characteristics with past games in the series, Road Rash 3D puts a stronger emphasis on the racing aspect of the game, and less on combat.

The individual courses for the game are pieced together from a larger system of interconnected grids of roads. Courses may overlap common segments of other tracks, but often have different start or end points, or have the player turning down alternate routes. While the player can opt to take the wrong route, taking them very far typically results in hitting "invisible walls" that restrict further movement in the given direction.

Music
The game featured licensed music from bands such as Soundgarden, Sugar Ray, Kid Rock, CIV, The Mermen, Full on the Mouth, and The Tea Party. Sugar Ray contributed three songs, "Speed Home California", "Tap, Twist, Snap" and "Mean Machine", as well as short track "The Club".

Development
The biker animations were created using motion capture, with the motion capture actors perched on motorcycle mock-ups.

A PC version with LAN enabled multiplayer and support for force feedback joysticks was planned, but never released.

Reception

Road Rash 3D received "average" reviews according to the review aggregation website GameRankings. The most common complaint was that the game failed to live up to the prior games in the series on the Sega Genesis and 3DO, especially that it lacked a two-player multiplayer mode. Edge highlighted the game's network of interconnecting roads and impressive 3D engine, stating that Road Rash 3D features "some of the best track design ever seen in a video game." However, the magazine criticized the execution of combat moves for being unresponsive and impractical, saying that they require precise timing and a significant degree of luck. GamePro said that the game was "not without its flaws [...] but its riveting action delivers enough high-octane excitement to make the game well worth its entry fee."

In a mixed review, GameSpot criticized the game for its graphical glitches, and for the fact that the game reduced the actual combat aspect of the gameplay that the series had been known for in prior iterations. IGN complained that despite two to three years of development time, that the game managed to control worse, and play slower, than the series' last release on the 3DO. AllGame echoed these sentiments, questioning the game's slow pace, graphical glitches, and overall lower quality than the prior game for the 3DO. GameRevolution referred to it as the "one of the worst motorcycle games...ever" and summarized that "most disappointing aspect of the game is the fact that it doesn't come close to matching the great gameplay of its predecessors." Next Generation said, "the flaws are too glaring. Even long-time Road Rash fans will prefer being dragged behind a Harley over broken glass to throwing this disc in their PlayStation."

The game won the "Outstanding Achievement in Sound and Music" award at AIAS' Second Interactive Achievement Awards.

Response and legacy
The game's lack of multiplayer and lack of emphasis on combat was frequently cited as a shortcoming of the game by critics. Electronic Arts representatives defended the lack of multiplayer, stating that the feature was impossible due to the way game data was streamed from the game disc. Such concerns were addressed in subsequent future releases. A year later, on September 27, 1999, Road Rash 64 was released. While it was initially thought to be a simple port of the game for the Nintendo 64, the end product turned out to be a major reworking of the game, putting a greater emphasis on combat, and including several multiplayer modes with support to up to four players. Additionally, the next game in the series, Road Rash: Jailbreak, especially focused gameplay on a two player cooperative mode where a second player can join in on a motorcycle's side car.

Notes

References

External links

1998 video games
Electronic Arts games
Motorcycle video games
PlayStation (console) games
PlayStation (console)-only games
Racing video games
Road Rash
Vehicular combat games
Video game sequels
Video games scored by Stuart Chatwood
Video games developed in the United States